Tobias Schneider (born 23 July 1981, Berlin) is a German speedskater.

He is employed by the German Army as a Sportsoldat (sports soldier). His best distances are the longer ones, the 5,000 m and 10,000 m, but he is also among the best current German allround skaters. On 25 November 2006 at the World Cup in Moscow he set a new German record on the 10,000 m with 13:16.36. This also made him the highest ranked German speedskater on the Adelskalender – a year later he was surpassed by Robert Lehmann, however. In 2006 he was selected as deutscher Eisschnellläufer des Jahres (German speedskater of the year).

As of January 2008, his personal records are 36.94 (500-m), 1:45.82 (1,500 m), 6:21.55 (5,000 m) and 13:16.36 (10,000 m), and his Adelskalender rank is #26.

External links 
 Schneider's homepage
 Tobias Schneider at SkateResults.com
 Current Adelskalender ranking

1981 births
Living people
German male speed skaters
Olympic speed skaters of Germany
Speed skaters at the 2006 Winter Olympics
21st-century German people